Gishkaur (Balochi) is town and union council of Awaran District in the Balochistan province of Pakistan. During the floods of 2007 Gishkaur was badly affected - 295 households (1038 people) were impacted.

References

Populated places in Awaran District
Union councils of Balochistan, Pakistan